Marinela Maxim (born 25 January 1955), also known as Marinela Ghiţă, is a Romanian rower. She competed in the women's coxless pair event at the 1976 Summer Olympics.

References

External links
 
 
 
 
 

1955 births
Living people
Romanian female rowers
Olympic rowers of Romania
Rowers at the 1976 Summer Olympics
Sportspeople from Bucharest